The French ironclad Savoie was one of 10  armored frigates built for the French Navy (Marine Nationale) during the 1860s. Commissioned in 1865, she was initially assigned to the Northern Squadron (Escadre du Nord), often serving as a flagship. The ironclad played a minor role in the Franco-Prussian War of 1870–1871, blockading the North Sea coast of Prussia. Savoie was reduced to reserve after the war, but was reactivated in 1872 and assigned to the Mediterranean Squadron (Escadre de la Méditerranée). The ship was decommissioned in 1879 and was used for testing in 1883. Savoie was stricken in 1888 and was scrapped the following year.

Design and description

The Provence class was designed as an enlarged version of the s with thicker armor, more powerful guns, and better seakeeping qualities. They displaced . Their crew numbered 579–594 officers and enlisted men.

When the French discovered that the British ironclad  had reached  during her sea trials, they decided to add an extra cylinder to the engine of the five ships still under construction in an attempt to achieve .

Armament and protection
The main battery of the Provence-class ships was intended to be thirty  Modèle 1858–60 rifled muzzle-loading (RML) guns, but this was changed to a mixed armament of four  Modèle 1864 RMLs and six  Modèle 1864 smoothbore muzzle-loading guns on the gundeck. Positioned on the quarterdeck and the forecastle were another 194 mm smoothbore and six 164.7 mm Modèle 1858 RMLs, at least some of which served as chase guns. By 1869–1870, Savoies armament consisted of eight 240 mm Modèle 1864 RMLs on the gundeck and four 194 mm Modèle 1864 smoothbores as chase guns on the quarterdeck and forecastle.

The conning tower's sides consisted of  armor plates.

Construction and service
Savoie, named after the historic province, was ordered on 16 November 1860 from the Arsenal de Toulon, laid down in March 1861 and launched on 29 September 1864. The ship was commissioned on 25 March 1865. She was assigned to the Ironclad Division (division cuirassée) of the Northern Squadron, based in Cherbourg and became the flagship of Rear Admiral Charles de Dompierre d'Hornoy on 22 July 1867. He was relieved by Rear Admiral Alexandre Dieudonné on 16 September 1869 and Savoie was later reduced to reserve.

When the Franco-Prussian War began on 19 July 1870, Savoie was still in reserve and she became the flagship of Rear Admiral Jérôme-Hyacinthe Penhoat. The ship was assigned to Vice Admiral Léon Martin Fourichon's squadron that was tasked to blockade German ports in the Heligoland Bight. It departed Brest on 8 August and arrived off the British-owned island of Heligoland three days later. The neutral British denied the French permission to re-coal there and the ships were forced to perform it at sea under dangerous conditions. Bad weather and a series of storms beginning in late August prevented the squadron from coaling and the ships were forced to return to France in early September. By then the Prussians were besieging Paris and many of the trained gunners aboard the squadron's ships were transferred to defend the city. The squadron resumed the blockade with reduced crews until December when smaller ships took it over.

Savoie was paid off in 1871 at Toulon, but she was recommissioned on 1 January 1872 as the flagship of Rear Admiral de Chaillé. He was relieved by Rear Admiral Charles Jules de Surville on 5 October. The ship was reduced to reserve at Toulon in 1874–1876. She was reactivated on 15 April 1876 and was commanded by Captain (Capitaine de Vaisseau) Théophile Aube, the future French Minister of Marine, in 1878. Savoie returned to reserve the following year, initially at Brest and then at Lorient. In 1883 she was assigned to the Experimental Division (division d'essais) at Cherbourg. The ship was stricken from the navy list on 19 November 1888 and was broken up the following year.

Citations

Bibliography

Further reading

1863 ships
Provence-class ironclads
Ships built in France